Rouy may refer to:

People
 Georges Rouy (1851–1924), French botanist
 Maryse Rouy (born 1951), French writer

Places
 Amigny-Rouy, Aisne, France
 Rouy, Nièvre, France
 Rouy-le-Grand, Somme, France
 Rouy-le-Petit, Somme, France